Châtenoy may refer to:

 Châtenoy, a commune of the Loiret department, in France
 Châtenoy, a commune of the Seine-et-Marne department, in France

See also 
 Châtenois (disambiguation)